Dominic Monypenny (born 9 October 1960) is an Australian Paralympic rower and skier. He is a two-time world champion in the adaptive fixed seat single-sculls rowing category.

Personal
In 1996 Monypenny fell  while rock climbing in the Cataract Gorge in Launceston resulting in paraplegia.

After his fall Monypenny continued to remain active in a range of sports including wheelchair tennis and Basketball, wheelchair racing, hand cycling, indoor rock climbing and skiing before concentrating on adaptive rowing.

As a member of the TASRAD Board (Tasmanian Sport and Recreation Association for people with a Disability), Dominic encouraged and mentored many other Tasmanians with disabilities to be active and participate in sports and recreation.

Monypenny holds a PhD in Organic Chemistry and is currently working at Lilydale District High School.

Summer Paralympics – Competitive Rowing
Monypenny took up the sport of rowing in 2003 training with the Tamar Rowing Club.  In a short period he was competing both nationally and internationally. At the 2008 Beijing Paralympics, he finished sixth in the Men's Single Sculls AM1x.

Winter Paralympics – Nordic Skiing
Soon after the 2008 Beijing Paralympics, Monypenny switched to Nordic Skiing with the aim of competing in the 2010 Vancouver Winter Paralympics.  His first major competition was in January 2009 for the US Nationals.    He competed in Vancouver in the Men's 1 km Sprint sitting, Men's 10 km sitting, and Men's 15 km sitting events. At the end of the Games, he announced his retirement from the sport.

Recognition
 2005 Australian Rower's Rower Award
 2005 Tasmanian Disabled Sportsperson
 2006 Tasmanian Disabled Sportsperson
 2007 Tasmanian Sportsman Award
 2015 Tasmanian Sporting Hall of Fame inductee

See also

History of the Paralympic Movement in Tasmania

References

Paralympic cross-country skiers of Australia
Paralympic rowers of Australia
Rowers at the 2008 Summer Paralympics
Cross-country skiers at the 2010 Winter Paralympics
World Rowing Championships medalists for Australia
Sportsmen from Tasmania
1960 births
Living people
Australian male rowers
Australian male cross-country skiers
21st-century Australian people